Romania participated in the Eurovision Song Contest 2022 in Turin, Italy, with "" performed by WRS. The Romanian broadcaster,  (TVR), organised the national final  2022 in order to select the Romanian entry for the 2022 contest. The national final consisted of three shows, including two semi-finals and a final. A total of 46 entries were selected and 10 qualifiers ultimately competed in the final on 5 March 2022, where the winner scoring top marks from both a jury panel and a public televote was selected. 

Romania was drawn to compete in the second semi-final of the Eurovision Song Contest which took place on 12 May 2022. Performing during the show in position 13, "" was announced among the top 10 entries of the second semi-final and hence qualified to compete in the final. In the final, Romania placed 18th with 65 points. It was later revealed that the country placed 9th in the semi-final with 118 points.

Background

In ,  (TVR) did not fully select its representative by means of the national final format  for the first time ever. They collaborated instead with Global Records to internally select the entrant, Roxen, with the entry "Alcohol You" being selected through a national final. However, the contest was ultimately cancelled due to the COVID-19 pandemic. Roxen was internally re-selected to take part in the  contest with the song "Amnesia", which failed to qualify to the final, placing 12th in the first semi-final. This marked the third consecutive time that the nation failed to qualify to the final of the Eurovision Song Contest since the introduction of semi-finals in 2004. Following the televised debate  ("Eurovision... frankly!") on 5 July 2021 which featured personalities of the national music industry, the broadcaster confirmed their intentions to participate at the 2022 Eurovision Song Contest on 20 October 2021 and would opt for a national final with several artists to select their 2022 entry.

Before Eurovision

Selecția Națională 2022 
 2022 was the national final organised by TVR in order to select Romania's entry for the Eurovision Song Contest 2022. The competition consisted of two shows: a semi-final featuring twenty songs and a final featuring ten songs to be held between 5 February and 5 March 2022. The two shows were televised on TVR1, TVR HD, TVRi as well as online via the broadcaster's streaming service TVR+ and YouTube. The two shows are also being broadcast in Moldova via the channel TVR Moldova. An additional three shows, titled  (Road to Turin) and hosted by Ilinca who represented Romania in the Eurovision Song Contest 2017, were aired on TVR1 between 5 and 7 February 2022 in order to give insight on the competing acts.

Competing entries 
TVR opened a submission period for artists and composers to submit their entries between 26 November 2021 and 19 December 2021. The broadcaster received 94 submissions within the submission deadline. After the combination of the jury votes, the top 45 entries that scored the highest, one per artist that entered with more than one song, were selected for the national final. The competing entries were announced on 23 December 2021. Among the selected competing artists are Ciro de Luca, who represented Romania in 2007 as part of Todomondo, and Cezar Ouatu, who previously represented Romania in the Eurovision Song Contest in 2013.

On 28 December 2021, TVR announced that "" performed by E-an-na would also participate in the competition following a successful appeal made by the performers. "Best of Me" performed by Alex Parker, Erik Frank and Bastien was withdrawn from the competition on the same day and replaced with Parker and Bastien's second song "All This Love". "Hypnotized" performed by Barbara Tešija, was withdrawn from the competition on 5 February 2022. On 9 February, "That Way" performed by Fabi was withdrawn from the semi-final due to Fabi testing positive for COVID-19.

Semi-finals 
The semi-finals took place on 5–10 and 12 February 2022. Forty-five songs competed in the first semi-final and twenty qualified to the second semi-final. A jury panel first selected fifteen songs to advance, and a public online vote which took place on the Eurovision Romania Facebook page on 9 and 10 February 2022 then selected an additional five qualifiers from the remaining thirty entries. The twenty qualifying entries were announced on 10 February during the TVR evening news broadcast. The second semi-final took place at the TVR studios in Bucharest, hosted by Anca Mazilu and Bogdan Stănescu with Ilinca hosting segments from the green room. Twenty songs competed and the jury panel selected ten songs to qualify to the final. The members of the jury panel that voted during the semi-finals were: Alexandra Ungureanu, Ozana Barabancea, Randi, Cristian Faur and Adrian Romcescu.

Final 
Ten songs competed and the winner, "" performed by WRS, was determined by the combination of the votes from the jury panel and public televoting. Each member of the jury voted by assigning scores from 1–8, 10 and 12 points to their preferred songs, with the juries awarding 290 points in total. The viewer vote was assigned by dividing the votes received by each song by the number of votes of the song that gained the most viewer votes. This number was then multiplied by 12 and rounded to two decimal places. For example, if song A received the most viewer votes and song B received 10% of song A's votes, then song A would be awarded 12 televoting points and song B would be awarded 1.2 televoting points. The members of the jury panel that voted during the final were: Alexandra Ungureanu, Ozana Barabancea, Randi, Cristian Faur and Adrian Romcescu. In addition to the performances of the competing entries, the interval acts featured performances by  Eurovision winner Jamala, who performed her winning song "1944", as well as seven  Eurovision entrants: Intelligent Music Project, Zdob și Zdub and Frații Advahov, Vladana, Andrea, Ronela Hajati, We Are Domi and Stefan.

Ratings

At Eurovision 
According to Eurovision rules, all nations with the exceptions of the host country and the "Big Five" (France, Germany, Italy, Spain and the United Kingdom) are required to qualify from one of two semi-finals in order to compete for the final; the top ten countries from each semi-final progress to the final. The European Broadcasting Union (EBU) split up the competing countries into six different pots based on voting patterns from previous contests, with countries with favourable voting histories put into the same pot. On 25 January 2022, an allocation draw was held which placed each country into one of the two semi-finals, as well as which half of the show they would perform in. Romania has been placed into the second semi-final, to be held on 12 May 2022, and has been scheduled to perform in the second half of the show.

Once all the competing songs for the 2022 contest had been released, the running order for the semi-finals was decided by the shows' producers rather than through another draw, so that similar songs were not placed next to each other.

Voting

Points awarded to Romania

Points awarded by Romania

Jury vote issues 
In a statement released during the broadcast of the grand final, the EBU revealed that six countries, including Romania, were found to have irregular jury voting patterns during the second semi-final. Consequently, these countries were given substitute aggregated jury scores for both the second semi-final and the grand final (shown above), calculated from the corresponding jury scores of countries with historically similar voting patterns as determined by the pots for the semi-final allocation draw held in January.  Their televoting scores were unaffected. The Flemish broadcaster VRT later reported that the juries involved had made agreements to vote for each others' entries to secure qualification to the grand final. 

During the broadcast of the final, Romania's votes were read by the EBU's Executive Supervisor, Martin Österdahl, instead of the scheduled spokesperson, Eda Marcus. This was attributed to connection difficulties during the voting, however the Azerbaijani broadcaster İTV, whose jury had also been identified as showing irregular voting patterns, released a statement implying that this was instead due to their refusal to present the calculated aggregate scores.

On 19 May, the EBU released a further statement clarifying the voting irregularities identified in the second semi-final. This confirmed that the six countries involved had consistently scored each others' entries disproportionately highly in the second semi-final: the Romanian jury, as well as the juries from Azerbaijan, Georgia and San Marino, had each ranked the other five countries' entries as their top five, proving beyond statistical coincidence that they had colluded to achieve a higher placing. This prompted the suspension of Romania's intended jury scores (shown below) in favour of the EBU's calculated aggregate scores, presented above.

The Romanian broadcaster TVR subsequently released a press statement revealing the Romanian jury's intended votes for the grand final, which had also been suspended. The statement went on to criticise the EBU for their communication and also suggested that other juries had participated in separate incidents of vote manipulation, although this was strongly refuted by the EBU. TVR concluded their statement by threatening the future participation of Romania in the contest as a result of the response to the incident. On 29 July, Romanian news outlet Impact.ro reported that TVR had dropped all objections towards the EBU regarding the exclusion of the Romanian jury.

Detailed final results 
The EBU published these detailed results for a short time on 13 July 2022.

References

2022
Countries in the Eurovision Song Contest 2022
Eurovision
Eurovision